Friederike von Alvensleben (1749-1799), was a German actor and theater director.  She was the managing director of a notable theater company, which was famous in Northern Germany during the second half of the 18th-century. She was first married to Karl Theophil Döbbelin and then to Johann Friedrich von Alvensleben (1736-1819).

References 

 Hildegard Bernick: Eine Liebesgeschichte aus dem 18. Jahrhundert oder Geschichten vom Theater und der Wirklichkeit. Herausgeber: Förderkreis Schlosskirche Erxleben e.V., Juni 2011 (16 S.)

1749 births
1799 deaths
18th-century German actresses
German stage actresses
Women theatre directors
18th-century theatre managers
Women theatre managers and producers